Heir property, or heirs' property, refers to a home or land that passes from generation to generation through inheritance, usually without a will or formal estate strategy. This unstable form of ownership limits a family’s ability to build generational wealth and hampers the efforts of nonprofits and cities to revitalize neighborhoods. 

Heirs' property disproportionately impacts racial and ethnic minority populations, low-income and low-wealth families, and rural and distressed urban areas. Research in several states shows heirs' property is a cross-cutting issue common to all communities. Specific research has focused on land loss among African Americans, Latinx communities in the Southwest, Indigenous communities on reservations, and white communities in Appalachia.

Background 
 
Heirs' property is created when the original owner of the home or land dies without a will or dies with a will leaving the property to multiple beneficiaries. The number of owners increases as additional heirs/owners die. The recorded deed for the real property is typically in the name of the deceased relative. This results in “fractured” or “tangled” titles shared among multiple family members that are difficult to use in order to prove ownership of the land. 
 
Heirs' property owners are considered tenants in common. Each heir has equal rights to full use and possession. Each heir is legally responsible for taxes and other real property-related expenses. Each heir may transfer interest in real property to another heir or outsider. Each heir may seek a partition of the real property. Each heir must agree to any major decisions about the real property.
 
Heirs' property has a negative effect on families and communities. Individuals living on heirs property face an increased risk of forced sale and eviction. Heirs cannot sell, mortgage or lease the heirs property without agreement of all heirs. Heirs have more difficulty farming, qualifying for agriculture loans, and selling agriculture products. Heirs cannot qualify for most rehab programs or secure financing for needed repairs for their heirs property. Heirs may not be able to participate in government programs offered by USDA, HUD, FEMA, and other federal and state agencies. Heirs cannot qualify for loan modifications and other loss mitigation programs when facing foreclosure. Heirs may not be able to qualify for conservation use tax reductions, homestead exemptions or other real property tax exemptions.

In this system, the land is held in common. After several generations, it can be difficult to determine who the legal owners are, and the legal owners might not have paid their share of taxes, lived on the land, or helped maintain it. African Americans were more likely to let land become heirs’ property due to a lack of access to government services and a distrust of the legal system during periods of systemic discrimination against African-Americans.

Impact of heirs property on African American communities

According to the United States Department of Agriculture, since 1910, the heir property system has been responsible for African Americans landowners losing 80% of the farming land owned by previous generations. In 1910, 16 million acres were operated by African American farmers, or 14% of farms. In 2023, under 3 million acres are operated African American farmers, and 1.5% of farms.  

Within the Southern United States, about a third of the land owned by African Americans, amounting to about 3.5 million acres, is held in the heirs property system.  Arkansas, Mississippi, Alabama, Georgia, South Carolina, Texas, North Carolina, Virginia, Florida, and Louisiana are the states most affected by the confusion of heirs' property.

Research from other states

In Georgia, a 2017 USDA and UGA Carl Vinson study determined that 11-25% of parcels in every county are probable heirs property. The total tax appraised value of probable heirs property in Georgia is more than $34 billion. The negative impacts of heirs property affect families and every aspect of community including the functioning of local government, court systems, state departments, banks, businesses, and nonprofits.

Legislation

Uniform Partition of Heirs Property Act 
The Uniform Partition of Heirs Property Act is being adopted by a number of states in order to help families preserve their wealth in the face of partition sales. Among other things, it requires improved procedures for serving notice on heirs and determining fair market value if the co-owners of the property are unable to agree. The UPHPA restructures partition sales with three major reforms: 

 If a co-owner brings a partition action in court, the court must provide an opportunity to the other co-owners to buy out the co-owner who brought the action.
 If there is no buyout, then the law provides a preference for the court to order a partition in kind and divide the property, rather than order a sale. 
 If a partition in kind is not ordered, the UPHPA requires the court to sell the property at a market sale, not at an auction sale, and specifies a process for the property to be appraised and sold for its fair market value. 

As of January 2023, 22 states and the Virgin Islands have passed the UPHPA.

2018 Farm Bill 
The 2018 Farm Bill, a piece of omnibus legislation that governs much of agricultural policy in the United States, required the USDA's Farm Service Agency to develop rules allowing heirs' property owners to obtain a farm and tract number, even with cloudy property title.

Federal Emergency Management Agency 
In October 2022, FEMA developed guidelines for its agents to accept heirs' property documentation to qualify for disaster relief.

References

American legal terminology
South Carolina law

External links 

 Heirs' Property and Land Fractionation: Fostering Stable Ownership to Prevent Land Loss and Abandonment -Publication from the U.S. Department of Agriculture, Forest Service.
Heirs' Property - National Agricultural Law Information Partnership, U.S. Department of Agriculture National Agricultural Library